The 1938 United States Senate election in California was held on November 2, 1938. Incumbent Democratic Senator William Gibbs McAdoo ran for a second term, but was defeated by Sheridan Downey in the Democratic primary. Downey went on to defeat Philip Bancroft in the general election.

Democratic primary

Candidates
Sheridan Downey, nominee for Lt. Governor in 1932 and leader in the End Poverty in California movement
William Gibbs McAdoo, incumbent Senator
James W. Mellen
John W. Preston, former Associate Justice of the California Supreme Court
Ray Riley, State Controller (cross-filing)

Campaign
Senator McAdoo had the support of President Franklin Roosevelt and George Creel.

Downey was supported by his 1932 running mate Upton Sinclair and pensioner advocate Francis Townsend.

Results

Republican primary

Candidates
Philip Bancroft, founding member of the Bull Moose Party
Ray Riley, State Controller since 1921
Louise Ward Watkins, community activist from Pasadena

Results
Although he did not cross-file to appear on the ballot, Sheridan Downey did receive write-in votes.

Progressive primary

Candidates
Paul H. Bruns
Sheridan Downey, Democratic nominee for Lt. Governor in 1932 (cross-filing)
Ray Riley, State Controller (cross-filing)

Results

Townsend Party primary

Candidates
Sheridan Downey, Democratic nominee for Lt. Governor in 1932 (cross-filing)
Ray Riley, State Controller (cross-filing)

Results

General election

Results

See also 
  1938 United States Senate elections

References 

1938 California elections
California
1938